Paul Joseph deLay (January 31, 1952 – March 7, 2007) was an American blues vocalist and harmonicist.

Life and career
Paul deLay was born in Portland, Oregon, United States.

His musical career started in the early 1970s with a band called "Brown Sugar", which played numerous West Coast gigs.  In 1976, he and guitarist Jim Mesi formed the Paul deLay Blues Band, which performed well into the 1980s. The band also recorded several albums during that time.

By the late 1980s, deLay was suffering from alcohol and cocaine addiction. In 1990, he was arrested for drug trafficking, and served a 41-month prison sentence.  He performed in Prison in Walla Walla with Michael Morey of Seattle's Alleged Perpetrators on bass.  While he was incarcerated, his band continued without him, performing as the "No deLay Band" and featuring longtime Portland blueswoman Linda Hornbuckle as lead vocalist in lieu of deLay. Upon his release from prison, deLay (now clean and sober) rejoined the band and recorded a series of critically acclaimed albums.

In 2002, deLay assembled the final version of his band, with David Vest sharing lead vocals and playing piano, Peter Dammann on guitar, and Jeff Minnick and Dave Kahl on drums and bass. A live CD featuring this lineup was released in 2007, entering the Top Ten on Billboard's national blues chart.

Paul deLay continued touring and recording until his final illness. In March 2007, after returning to Portland from a gig in Klamath Falls, Oregon, deLay felt ill and sought medical treatment.  It was discovered that he was suffering from end-stage leukemia; he soon lapsed into a coma from which he would not recover. He died in Portland on March 7, 2007, aged 55.

An outgrowth of the memorial concerts is an annual event, a benefit for a scholarship at Ethos, a non-profit, Portland-based music education program, in deLay's name.

Awards and achievements
Over his career, deLay received a W.C. Handy Award for best instrumentalist, a recording of the year award from the Portland Music Association, and several awards from the Cascade Blues Association.

References

1952 births
2007 deaths
American blues singers
American blues harmonica players
Deaths from leukemia
Harmonica blues musicians
Musicians from Portland, Oregon
Deaths from cancer in Oregon
20th-century American musicians
Singers from Oregon
20th-century American singers